Sir Robert Fagge, 2nd Baronet (ca. 1649 – 22 August 1715) was an English politician.

He was the son of Sir John Fagg, 1st Baronet and brother of John Fagg II.
Fagge was admitted to St Catharine's College, Cambridge in 1663, and to the Inner Temple in 1664.

He sat as Member of Parliament for New Shoreham between 1679 and 1681 and for Steyning between 1690 and 1695 and again between 1701 and 1702. He succeeded his father as second Baronet in 1701.

He married Elizabeth Culpeper and was succeeded by their only son, Sir Robert Fagge, 3rd Baronet.

References

1640s births
1715 deaths
Baronets in the Baronetage of England
Year of birth uncertain
English MPs 1679
English MPs 1680–1681
English MPs 1690–1695
English MPs 1701
English MPs 1701–1702
People from Steyning